Ruth Ellen Berkeley was an English mycologist, collector of fungi specimens and scientific botanical illustrator. She is known for her specimen collections as well as her illustrations of British fungi particularly in Mordecai Cubitt Cooke's book Illustrations of British Fungi (Hymenomycetes). Her father, the mycologist Miles Joseph Berkeley, named a fungal species Agaricus ruthae (now known as Pleurotus ruthae) in her honour.

Gallery

References 

Botanical illustrators
Scientific illustrators
 Mycologists
1846 births
Year of death missing